Don't Stop may refer to:

Albums 
 Don't Stop (Annie album) or the title song, 2009
 Don't Stop (Billy Idol EP), 1981
 Don't Stop (Jeffrey Osborne album) or the title song, 1984
 Don't Stop (Jolin Tsai album), or the title song, 2000
 Don't Stop (Rockets album) or the title song, 2003
 Don't Stop (Status Quo album), 1996
 Don't Stop, by Bloodstone, 1979

Songs 
 "Don't Stop" (5 Seconds of Summer song), 2014
 "Don't Stop!" (ATB song), 1999
 "Don't Stop" (Baby Bash song), 2008
 "Don't Stop" (CDB song), 1996
 "Don't Stop" (Fleetwood Mac song), 1977
 "Don't Stop" (Innerpartysystem song), 2008
 "Don't Stop" (Isa song), 2015
 "Don't Stop" (Megan Thee Stallion song), 2020
 "Don't Stop" (Nothing More song), 2017
 "Don't Stop" (Rolling Stones song), 2002
 "Don't Stop" (Wade Hayes song), 1995
 "Don't Stop...", by Oasis, 2020
 "Don't Stop (Color on the Walls)", by Foster the People, 2012
 "Don't Stop (Funkin' 4 Jamaica)", by Mariah Carey, 2001
 "Don't Stop (Wiggle Wiggle)", by the Outhere Brothers, 1994
 "All Nite (Don't Stop)", by Janet Jackson, 2004
 "Gonna Make Ya Move (Don't Stop)", by Pink, 1998
 "Don't Stop", by Ace of Base from Da Capo
 "Don't Stop", by Brazilian Girls from Brazilian Girls
 "Don't Stop", by Bucks Fizz, B-side of "Making Your Mind Up"
 "Don't Stop", by Chali 2na from Fish Outta Water
 "Don't Stop!", by Child Rebel Soldier
 "Don't Stop", by Diana Ross from Take Me Higher
 "Don't Stop", by Geraint Watkins
 "Don't Stop", by Gloria Estefan from Gloria!
 "Don't Stop", by Heavy D from Heavy
 "Don't Stop", by Madonna from Bedtime Stories
 "Don't Stop", by MC Hammer from The Funky Headhunter
 "Don't Stop", by Nidji from Breakthru'
 "Don't Stop", by Our Lady Peace from Healthy in Paranoid Times
 "Don't Stop", by Snoop Dogg from Coolaid
 "Don't Stop", by the Stone Roses from The Stone Roses
 "Don't Stop", by Sylvester from All I Need
 "Don't Stop", by Todrick Hall from Haus Party, Pt. 3
 "Don't Stop", by Zion & Lennox from Motivando A La Yal: Special Edition
 "Don't Stop", by Ruff Driverz, 1998
 "Don't Stop (Doin' It)", by Anastacia from Freak of Nature
 "Don't Stop", by Jars of Clay from The Long Fall Back to Earth, 2009

See also
 
 Can't Stop (disambiguation)